Margaret Ruthven Lang (November 27, 1867 – May 29, 1972) was an American composer, affiliated with the Second New England School.  Lang was also one of the first two women composers (along with Amy Beach) to have compositions performed by American symphony orchestras: Lang's Dramatic Overture, by the Boston Symphony Orchestra, 1893; Beach's Grand Mass in E-flat, 1892, by the Handel and Haydn Society; and Beach's Gaelic Symphony, 1896, by the Boston Symphony..

Life
Margaret Lang was born in Boston, Massachusetts.  She was the eldest child of Frances Morse Burrage Lang, an amateur singer, and Benjamin Johnson "B. J." Lang, a conductor, pianist, organist, composer, and accompanist (later director) of several choral groups including: The Apollo Club, The Cecilia Society, and the Handel and Haydn Society. B. J. Lang was a powerful member of the musical aristocracy of Boston and the Lang home, located at 8 Brimmer Street, saw many guests including Maude Powell, Camilla Urso, Antonín Dvořák, and Paderewski.  B. J. Lang was also a friend of Franz Liszt and his daughter Cosima, and of Richard Wagner.  Margaret knew Wagner's children as playmates.

After demonstrating an early talent for composition, B. J. saw to it that Margaret received lessons in harmony, counterpoint and later, orchestration.  In 1886, at the age of 19, Margaret, accompanied by her mother, traveled to Munich to study violin with Franz Drechsler and Ludwig Abel and counterpoint and fugue with Victor Gluth.  However, she was not allowed to enter the Royal Conservatory of Music, as women were barred from counterpoint classes until 1898.

After returning to Boston, Margaret studied orchestration and composition with George Whitefield Chadwick, who was then professor at the New England Conservatory.  She also studied, occasionally, with John Knowles Paine and J. C. D. Parker, who were also members of the Second New England School.

Margaret composed over 200 songs, which were well received and often performed in concert halls throughout Boston.  A. P. Schmidt Co. of Boston also published many of the songs.  However, it was the April 1893 debut of her Dramatic Overture, Op. 12, that made history.  The Boston Symphony Orchestra, under the direction of Arthur Nikisch, premiered the work, making the piece the first composition by a woman to be performed by a major American symphony orchestra.  Though the piece did elicit some positive and constructive reviews, the Dramatic Overture was never repeated.  Almost immediately after the performance by the Boston Symphony, a second overture, Witichis, Op. 10, was performed at the 1893 World's Fair (Columbian Exposition) in Chicago under the direction of Theodore Thomas.  Other large works included compositions for voice and orchestra.  B. J. Lang conducted some of Margaret's works.  Margaret was very critical of her work, however, and was known to destroy pieces that she did not feel confident of.  Consequently, none of her works for orchestra are extant, likely destroyed by Margaret herself.

After Benjamin Johnson Lang's death in 1909, Margaret, who never married, became principal caretaker of her mother and also saw to the family's estate, which was worth approximately $600,000 at the time of her father's death.  Theodore Presser published her final composition, Three Pianoforte Pieces for Young Players, Op. 60, in 1919.  After she stopped composing, Margaret devoted much of her energy to religious work.  Though her family belonged to the Unitarian Universalist church, Margaret became a devout Episcopalian, and attended the Church of the Advent in Boston.  Between 1927 and 1939, she anonymously wrote, published and printed devotional pamphlets entitled "Messages from God" which were distributed throughout the United States and as far as Egypt.  Using her own money to fund the project, Margaret recorded in an autobiographical note that over 6,000 copies of these books were produced and sent throughout the world, free of charge to the recipient.

Margaret also holds the record for the longest consecutive subscriber to the Boston Symphony Orchestra, totaling 91 years.  In 1967 the orchestra performed a concert in honor of Margaret's 100th birthday.   They also installed a small plaque on her seat, 1st Balcony, Right, B1, in honor of her dedication to the orchestra.  Margaret died May 29, 1972, six months short of her 105th birthday.  The Lang Family papers, including Margaret's scrapbooks and Frances Lang's personal diaries, are available in the Rare Books and Manuscript department of the Boston Public Library.

Several compositions are available in modern editions through Hildegard Publishing.  These include Nonsense Rhymes and Pictures by Edward Lear, Op. 42, O Jala, Spinning Song, Irish Love Song, and Snowflakes, as well as other songs and piano works in compilations with works by other women composers.  Her Irish Love Song was a particular favorite among audiences and was recorded by several famous singers, including Ernestine Schumann-Heink and Alma Gluck. Many of the autograph copies of Margaret's songs can be found in the Arthur P. Schmidt papers in the Library of Congress.

Discography 
Many of Margaret's songs were very popular during her lifetime. In the Twilight and Irish Love Song were the most performed.  Many vocalists recorded versions of them and several of the recordings are available in a restored version.

Ernestine Schumann-Heink: The Complete Recordings, Volume 1: 1900–09. Romophone, 1997.  
Richard Crooks in Songs and Ballads.  Nimbus Records, 1997.  
Alma Gluck.  Marston, 1997.  
"Ah! Love but a day": Songs and Spirituals by Women Composers.  Albany, N.Y.: Albany Records/Videmus, 2000.
Love is Everywhere:Selected Songs of Margaret Ruthven Lang. Donald George (Tenor) & Lucy Mauro (Piano). Delos Productions, Inc. 2011.

Notes

Bibliography 
Ammer, Christine.  "Unsung: A History of Women in American Music".  Portland, OR: Amadeus Press, 2001.  
Blunsom, Laurie.  "Gender, Genre and professionalism: the Songs of Clara Rogers, Helen Hopekirk, Amy Beach, Margaret Lang and Mabel Daniels, 1880-1925", Ph.D. diss, Brandeis University, 1999.
Cline, Judith Ann. "Margaret Ruthven Lang: Her life and songs",  Ph.D. diss, Washington University, 1993.
Johnston, James W. "Margaret Ruthven Lang.com" website

External links
 
 
 Works by Margaret Ruthven Lang in the Ball State University Digital Media Repository.

1867 births
1972 deaths
American centenarians
American women composers
American composers
Musicians from Boston
Pupils of George Whitefield Chadwick
Women centenarians